The 1998–99 season was the 96th competitive season in Belgian association football.

National team

* Belgium score given first

Key
 H = Home match
 A = Away match
 F = Friendly
 og = own goal

Honours

See also
 Belgian First Division 1998-99
 1999 Belgian Super Cup
 Belgian Second Division
 Belgian Third Division: divisions A and B
 Belgian Promotion: divisions A, B, C and D

References
 FA website – International results